Itha Oru Theeram is a 1979 Indian Malayalam film,  directed by P. G. Vishwambharan and produced by O. M. John. The film stars Soman, Sukumari, Jayabharathi, Kaviyoor Ponnamma and Kuthiravattam Pappu in the lead roles. The film has musical score by K. J. Joy and portraits the evergreen Malayalam song Akkareyikkare Ninnal Anganey. The film turned out to be a super hit.

Cast
Sukumari as Meenakshi
Jayabharathi as Sudha
Kaviyoor Ponnamma as Madhavi
Kuthiravattam Pappu as Chellappan
M. G. Soman as Gopi
Bahadoor as Sankara Pilla
Janardhanan as Chandran
Bhavani as Valsala
Thampi Kannanthanam as boatman in Akkaeyikkare

Soundtrack
The music was composed by K. J. Joy and the lyrics were written by Yusufali Kechery.

References

External links
 

1979 films
1970s Malayalam-language films
Films directed by P. G. Viswambharan
Films scored by K. J. Joy